The Ottawa-Kent Conference is an athletic league located in West Michigan. Its current leader is David VanNoord.  It has member schools from Allegan, Ionia, Kent, Montcalm, Muskegon, and Ottawa Counties.  It has 48 member schools that partake in athletics.  According to the MHSAA they have the main offices located at Grandville High School.

Members

 Note: The class and population size are from the 2022-23 MHSAA listings.  The # next to the year admitted is for founding members.

Classifications
As of the 2006-07 school year the conference has put a requirement in writing for which sports they want all schools to have a varsity level program in.  Those include Baseball, Basketball (boys & girls), Football, Softball (girls), Track & Field (boys & girls), Volleyball (girls), and Wrestling

They also listed a second group of sports which they want a minimal of two more sports in varsity level.  Those include Bowling (boys & girls), Competitive Cheer (girls), Cross Country (boys & girls), Golf (boys & girls), Gymnastics (girls), Ice Hockey, Soccer (boys & girls), Swimming (boys & girls), Tennis (boys & girls), and Water Polo (boys & girls)

Furthermore, for expansion purposes they must have a JV program in the mandatory programs along with adding freshman programs.  This has been a change when in 2004 they wanted freshman programs in all of the required programs instead they want to see improvement in the schools to have them form one when participation is high enough to warrant it.

Sports not listed as ones they will offer varsity status for include Lacrosse (boys & girls) and Skiing (boys & girls).

Current Alignment

OK-Red

East Kentwood
Rockford
Holland West Ottawa
Grand Haven
Hudsonville
Grandville
Caledonia
Jenison

OK-Green

Grand Rapids Union
Muskegon Mona Shores
Wyoming
Muskegon Reeths-Puffer
Holland
Zeeland West
Muskegon
Zeeland East

OK-White

Forest Hills Central
Grand Rapids Forest Hills Northern
Lowell
Byron Center
Grand Rapids Northview
Greenville
East Grand Rapids
Grand Rapids Christian

OK-Gold

Grand Rapids Ottawa Hills
Cedar Springs
Kenowa Hills
Middleville Thornapple-Kellogg
Forest Hills Eastern
Wayland
Grand Rapids Catholic Central
Grand Rapids South Christian

OK-Blue

Spring Lake
Coopersville
Fruitport
Hamilton
Allendale
Holland Christian
Hudsonville Unity Christian
Grand Rapids West Catholic

OK-Silver

Sparta
Kelloggsville
Godwin Heights
Comstock Park
Belding
Hopkins
Northpointe Christian
Calvin Christian

Past realignments

Every two years, the conference realigns itself due to changes in school sizes as some school districts increase at a large rate while others may stay constant or decline. Along with the changes in school populations, they also hear requests to join the conference. The process is a lengthy one and requires a 75% majority of the member schools to allow any new school in the conference. The Grand Rapids City League will be joining the conference for the 2008–2009 season. According to the Grand Rapids Press, the principals passed the league with a 43 to 1 vote. The future alignment for the expansion is still on the table but the one currently being discussed will have seven divisions (one more than present) and has been passed by the committee of athletic directors 34 to 10.  It is in line with what the conference has done in the past.  The executive board is made up of at least one principal from each division would have to pass the alignment on April 18. After that the Executive Council made up all of the principals will ratify it by May 9. The thought process is only do minor alignment change in two years followed by a possible major realignment in fours depending on different factors.  The difference would be actual schools added to the conference or change in the number of divisions versus just flip flopping schools around.

According to the GR Press, seven schools voted no for several different reasons.  Two schools, Lowell and Zeeland West did not show up for the meeting and as such no votes were given to them.  The other schools include Lee, East Kentwood, Hudsonville, Jenison, and Middleville.  The reasons given by the press for their no votes were because of concerns about the possibility that the four Grand Rapids Public Schools might drop their athletic programs, because of the enrollment differential in some divisions and because of the size of some of the divisions.  According to past policies of those schools and previous article quotes from those schools it is assumed what schools felt which way.  For Jenison, Hudsonville, and Lee it was the enrollment differences along with the size of their division.  East Kentwood and probably Middleville were upset with the Athletic Director of the Grand Rapids Public Schools discussing saving money by eliminating two high school ADs after the first two votes of the conference to let them into the conference.

All seven City League schools officially became full members of the OK Conference beginning with the 2008–09 school year.

The Swimming Conferences were realigned for the 2011–2012 school year and consist of only four levels.

In 2019, a new alignment was enacted that took effect with the 2020–2021 school year.  The OK Black division was abolished. The proposal was passed by a vote of 35 to 14 (33 votes or higher to pass).

Notable alumni
Notable Alumni who have participated athletically in the OK Conference
Robert Jackson, former NFL Player
Ray Bentley, former NFL Player
Kirk Cousins, current NFL Player
Mike Dumas, former NFL Player
Paul Grasmanis, former NFL Player
Kevin Haverdink, former NFL Player
Gary Hogeboom, former NFL Player
Mike Knuble, NHL Player
Mitch Lyons, former NFL Player
Jay Riemersma, former NFL Player
Steve Scheffler, former NBA Player
Joel Smeenge, former NFL Player
Joe Staley, Current NFL player
Matt Steigenga, former NBA Player
John Vander Wal, former MLB Player
Brent Gates, former MLB Player
Loy Vaught, former NBA Player
Dathan Ritzenhein, Two Time Olympian in Track and Field
Brian Diemer, Bronze Medalist - 1984 Olympics in Track and Field, three time Olympian
Luke Jensen, Former professional tennis player who reached a #6 world ranking in doubles.
Ron Essink, Former NFL Player Drafted 1980 - Grand Valley wrestling All American.
Ryan McDonald, Former NFL Player - All American and Rose Bowl starter with University of Illinois
 Justin Abdelkader, former NHL player.

State championships
Schools that have won MHSAA (unless otherwise noted) state championships while being members of OK Conference.

Note: The Comstock Park Championship was determined by Individual Format versus the Team Duel Format.
Note: Water polo is not recognized by the MHSAA but the OK Conference allows it full varsity status. The teams compete for the Michigan Water Polo Association (MWPA) State Championship.

Membership Timeline

References

External links
 

Michigan high school sports conferences
High school sports conferences and leagues in the United States
West Michigan